Spencer Bailey (born August 18, 1985) is an American writer, editor, and journalist. He has written at length about architecture, art, culture, and design, among other subjects.

Early life
Bailey was born and raised in Denver, Colorado.

United Airlines Flight 232

On July 19, 1989, a month before his fourth birthday, Bailey survived the crash landing of United Airlines Flight 232 in Sioux City, Iowa. His brother Brandon also survived the crash, but their mother, Frances, was one of the 111 passengers who died. Bailey's brother Trent and their father, Brownell, were not on the plane. Bailey is the subject of a famous photograph by Gary Anderson showing Lt. Colonel Dennis Nielsen carrying him to safety. A statue based on the picture is part of the Flight 232 Memorial in Sioux City's riverfront development.

Education
Bailey graduated from Pomfret School in Pomfret, Connecticut, in 2004. He received a B.A. in English from Dickinson College in Carlisle, Pennsylvania, in 2008 and an M.S. in journalism from Columbia University Graduate School of Journalism in 2010. 

In 2009, he was a student in a fiction-writing seminar taught by Gordon Lish.

Career

2009–2010: Early work
In 2009 and 2010, Bailey interned in the editorial departments at Esquire and Vanity Fair.

2010–2014: Bloomberg Businessweek, The New York Times Magazine
From 2010 to 2013, Bailey was a frequent contributor to Bloomberg Businessweek, and from 2011 to 2014, The New York Times Magazine.

Reporting for The New York Times Magazine, in October 2011, he spent a night at Zucotti Park and a nearby McDonald's during the Occupy Wall Street movement. Over the next three years, he interviewed authors, celebrities, politicians, and cultural figures such as Al Sharpton, Tony Hawk, Rodney King, and Cyndi Lauper for a "How to ..." column. Bailey's interview with Rodney King was one of King's last before his fiancée found him dead at the bottom of a swimming pool.

2010–2018: Surface Media
From May to August 2010, Bailey worked at The Daily Beast, and in September 2010 he was hired as assistant editor at Surface magazine.

In June 2013, at age 27, Bailey became editor-in-chief of Surface. With the July/August 2013 issue—Bailey’s first as editor—the magazine unveiled a major design overhaul. At Surface, Bailey interviewed hundreds of leading architects, artists, designers, and cultural figures, including David Adjaye, Tadao Ando, Zaha Hadid, Ian Schrager, and Kanye West, and helped launch the Design Dialogues conversation series. Bailey's interview with Kanye West, published in the December 2016/January 2017 issue, was covered internationally. Page Six described the conversation between Bailey and West "strange"; Billboard called it "thoughtful."

In January 2017, Bailey was named editorial director of Surface Media. In May 2018, Bailey announced he was leaving Surface Media.

2018–Present: The Slowdown
In 2018, Bailey was named a contributing editor at Town & Country, where he covers architecture and design, and joined the book publisher Phaidon as editor-at-large.

In May 2019, with the filmmaker, photographer, and creative director Andrew Zuckerman, Bailey founded and launched the media company The Slowdown. Bailey hosts The Slowdown’s Time Sensitive podcast, on which he has interviewed guests including author and translator Jhumpa Lahiri, poet and playwright Claudia Rankine, and artist Rashid Johnson. In March 2020, at the beginning of the COVID-19 lockdowns, Bailey and Zuckerman created the podcast At a Distance, which was later published as a book, At a Distance: 100 Visionaries at Home in a Pandemic, in November 2021.

In October 2020, Phaidon published Bailey’s book In Memory Of: Designing Contemporary Memorials, which features more than 60 memorials commemorating some of the most destructive events of the 20th and 21st centuries, including war, genocide, massacre, terrorism, famine, and slavery. The book was named a Literary Hub "favorite book of the year" and a Financial Times "best book of 2020."

Bibliography 

 Tham ma da: The Adventurous Interiors of Paola Navone (Pointed Leaf Press, 2016)
 In Memory Of: Designing Contemporary Memorials (Phaidon, 2020)
 At a Distance: 100 Visionaries at Home in a Pandemic (Apartamento, 2021)
 Alchemy: The Material World of David Adjaye (Phaidon, 2023)

References

External links

1985 births
Living people
Survivors of aviation accidents or incidents
Pomfret School alumni
Dickinson College alumni
Columbia University Graduate School of Journalism alumni
American architecture writers
American magazine editors